Novosibirsk Hydroelectric Station is a hydroelectric power plant on the Ob River. It is located in Sovetsky City District of Novosibirsk, Russia.

History
Construction began in 1950. The station was separately visited by Nikita Khrushchev and Richard Nixon in 1959.

Gallery

Shipping Canal
The Novosibirsk Shipping Canal is part of the hydroelectric power station.

References

Hydroelectric power stations in Russia
Dams in Russia
Dams completed in 1959
Dams on the Ob River
Buildings and structures in Novosibirsk
Sovetsky District, Novosibirsk
Cultural heritage monuments of regional significance in Novosibirsk Oblast
Hydroelectric power stations built in the Soviet Union
1950 establishments in the Soviet Union